Ian Jason Lewison (born 23 September 1981) is a British former professional boxer who competed from 2009 to 2017. He challenged once for the British heavyweight title in 2016.

Career
Lewison travelled to Nanning, China to face Zhu Yu Wu on 24 June 2016 for the vacant WBO Asia Pacific heavyweight title, winning by a knockout in the second round. He then went on to fight Dillian Whyte in Glasgow at The SSE Hydro for the vacant BBBofC British heavyweight title on 7 October. Lewison was forced to retire at the end of the 10th round. Having sustained a broken nose he was pulled from the fight by his trainer, Don Charles.

Professional boxing record

References

External links
 

1981 births
Living people
People from Brixton
Heavyweight boxers
English male boxers
Prizefighter contestants
Boxers from Greater London